Saeid Daghighi (born January 21, 1986) is an Iranian football player. In 2008 he was banned for six months for doping.

Doping ban
In 2008, Daghighi was given a 6-month ban from football along with teammate Faruk Ihtijarević for testing positive for performance-enhancing substances.

Club career

Club career statistics

 Assist Goals

International career
He was invited to national football team on 1 July 2011 by Carlos Queiroz. He made his debut in a friendly match against Madagascar.

International goals

Honours
Saba
Hazfi Cup (1): 2004–05

Tractor
Hazfi Cup (1): 2013–14

References

1986 births
Living people
Iranian footballers
Persian Gulf Pro League players
Azadegan League players
Shahrdari Tabriz players
Saba players
PAS Hamedan F.C. players
Paykan F.C. players
Saipa F.C. players
People from Qazvin
Iranian sportspeople in doping cases
Gostaresh Foulad F.C. players
Machine Sazi F.C. players
Iranian sportsperson-politicians
Iranian city councillors
Association football forwards